Here is a list of current fighters in the Rizin Fighting Federation.

Heavyweight (120 kg)

Welterweight (77 kg)

Lightweight (71 kg)

Featherweight (66 kg)

Bantamweight (61 kg)

Flyweight (57 kg)

Women's Super Atomweight (49 kg)

See also
List of Rizin FF champions
List of Rizin FF events
2023 in Rizin Fighting Federation
List of current UFC fighters
List of current ACA fighters
List of current Brave CF fighters
List of current Bellator fighters
List of current Combate Global fighters
List of current Invicta FC fighters
List of current KSW fighters
List of current ONE fighters
List of current PFL fighters
List of current Road FC fighters

References

External links

Lists of mixed martial artists